Club Atlético Osasuna B, usually known as Osasuna Promesas is the reserve team of CA Osasuna, a Spanish football club based in Pamplona, in the autonomous community of Navarre. Founded in 1962, currently plays in Primera Federación – Group 2, holding home matches at the Tajonar Facilities with 4,500-seat capacity.

History
Osasuna B was founded in 1962 as Osasuna Promesas, being renamed in 1991. It first reached the third division in the 1982–83 season, then again in 1987, the latter spell eventually lasting more than two decades.

From 1994 until 2000 Osasuna B was not eligible for promotion, as the main side was playing in the second level.

A change in the club structure from 2016 meant that an affiliate club, CD Iruña of the Tercera División became part of the Osasuna structure. The Iruña team had to play at least one division below Osasuna B, which soon had a consequence when the latter were relegated from their 2017–18 Segunda División B group and Iruña, who had maintained their status for 15 seasons, were administratively sent down to the Primera Autonómica de Navarra.

In the 2018–19 season, Osasuna B won Group 15 of the Tercera División. After the win over Cádiz B in the promotional play-offs, the team were promoted back to Segunda División B for the 2019–20 season.

In the summer of 2020, the Osasuna affiliation with Iruña was ended (though they would remain a local partner club) and a new arrangement was made with CD Subiza to act as the B-team's feeder.

Season to season

1 season in Primera Federación
33 seasons in Segunda División B
1 season in Segunda División RFEF
10 seasons in Tercera División
14 seasons in Categorías Regionales

Honours
Tercera División (3): 1985–86, 1986–87, 2015–16

Current squad
.

Reserve team

References

External links
Official website 
Futbolme team profile 
Fansite 

 
Football clubs in Navarre
Spanish reserve football teams
Association football clubs established in 1962
1962 establishments in Spain
Sport in Pamplona
Primera Federación clubs